John Linn is the name of:
John Linn (politician) (1763–1821), U.S. Representative from New Jersey
John Linn (Royal Engineer), British army engineer
John Blair Linn (1777–1804), American poet

See also
John Lynn (disambiguation)